"My Mistake" is a single by American country music singer Cam. It is the first single from her 2015 second album Untamed.

Content
The song is about a one-night stand told from the female's perspective. She refers to the male in the song as "my mistake to make all night".

Before Cam released her debut album, "My Mistake" and three other songs were included on an EP titled Welcome to Cam Country.

Critical reception
In his review of Welcome to Cam Country for Allmusic, David Jeffries wrote that "if getting the clever hit 'My Mistake'[...] was the impetus for the EP, so be it. The highlight and earworm is surrounded by equally infectious numbers". Billy Dukes from Taste of Country reviewed the song favorably, saying that "Lyrically she and Tyler Johnson haven’t written an overly complicated or colorful song. The verses are short, sweet and sonically flawless[...]'My Mistake' shows both Cam’s strong voice and personality."

Personnel
From Untamed liner notes.
Musicians
Tom Bukovac - electric guitar
Jeff Bhasker - piano
Glen Duncan - bouzouki
Tyler Johnson - keyboards, programming, background vocals
Steve Jordan - drums
Tony Lucido - bass guitar
Cam (as Camaron Ochs) - vocals
Russ Pahl - pedal steel guitar

Technical
Jeff Bhasker - production
John Castelli - mixing
Tyler Johnson - production, vocal engineering
Lindsay Marias - vocal production
Melissa Mattey - engineering
Ryan Nasci - engineering for mix
Dave O'Donnell - engineering

Chart positions

References

Cam (singer) songs
2015 singles
Arista Nashville singles
Song recordings produced by Jeff Bhasker
2015 songs
Songs written by Cam (singer)
Songs written by Tyler Johnson (musician)